Jamie Mullarkey (born 17 August 1994) is an Australian mixed martial artist who competes in the Lightweight division of the Ultimate Fighting Championship.

Background
Mullarkey grew up in Central Coast area, attending Erina High School. He began training mixed martial arts at the age of 14 during rugby off-seasons to keep in shape.

Mixed martial arts career

Early career
Starting his professional career in 2013, Mullarkey compiled a 12–2 record on the regional Australian scene, winning the UFN Lightweight Championship, Super Fight MMA Lightweight Championship, and BRACE Featherweight Championship in the process. He also fought future UFC Featherweight Champion Alexander Volkanovski for the Australian Fighting Championship Featherweight title, losing the bout in the first round via KO.

Ultimate Fighting Championship
Mullarkey made his UFC debut against fellow newcomer, Brad Riddell at UFC 243 on 5 October 2019. He lost the bout via unanimous decision but took home the Fight of the Night bonus.

Mullarkey was expected to face Jalin Turner on 3 February 2020 at UFC Fight Night 168. However Mullarkey was forced to withdraw from the bout due to injury and he was replaced by Joshua Culibao.

Mullarkey made his sophomore appearance in the organization against Farès Ziam at UFC Fight Night: Ortega vs. The Korean Zombie on 18 October 2020. He lost the fight via unanimous decision.

Mullarkey faced Khama Worthy at UFC 260 on 27 March 2021. He won via knockout within the first minute of the bout.

Mullarkey faced Devonte Smith on October 2, 2021 at UFC Fight Night 193. He won the fight via technical knockout in round two. This win earned him the Performance of the Night award.

Mullarkey faced Jalin Turner on March 5, 2022 at UFC 272. He lost the fight via technical knockout in round two.

Mullarkey faced Michael Johnson on July 9, 2022 at UFC on ESPN: dos Anjos vs. Fiziev. He won the fight via split decision. The bout earned the Fight of the Night bonus award.

Mullarkey was scheduled to face  Magomed Mustafaev on October 22, 2022 at UFC 280. However, Mullarkey pulled out in mid-September due to injury.

Mullarkey was scheduled to face Nasrat Haqparast on February 12, 2023, at UFC 284.  However, Haqparast withdrew due to undisclosed reason and was replaced by promotional newcomer Francisco Prado. He won the fight via unanimous decision.

Championships and achievements

Mixed martial arts
Ultimate Fighting Championship
Fight of the Night (Two times)  
Performance of the Night (One time) 
BRACE MMA
BRACE Season 1 Featherweight Tournament Championship
BRACE Featherweight Champion (one time; former)
Urban Fight Night
UFN Lightweight Champion (one time; former)
Superfight MMA
SFMMA Lightweight Champion (one time; former)
One successful title defense

Mixed martial arts record

|-
|Win
|align=center|16–5
|Francisco Prado
|Decision (unanimous)
|UFC 284
|
|align=center|3
|align=center|5:00
|Perth, Australia 
|
|-
|Win
|align=center|15–5
|Michael Johnson
|Decision (split)
|UFC on ESPN: dos Anjos vs. Fiziev
|
|align=center|3
|align=center|5:00
|Las Vegas, Nevada, United States
|
|-
|Loss
|align=center|14–5
|Jalin Turner
|TKO (punches)
|UFC 272
|
|align=center|2
|align=center|0:46
|Las Vegas, Nevada, United States
|
|-
| Win
|align=center|14–4
| Devonte Smith
| TKO (punches)
| UFC Fight Night: Santos vs. Walker
| 
| align=center| 2
| align=center| 2:51
| Las Vegas, Nevada, United States
| 
|-
| Win
|align=center|13–4
|Khama Worthy
|KO (punches)
|UFC 260 
|
|align=center|1
|align=center|0:46
|Las Vegas, Nevada, United States
|
|-
|Loss
|align=center|12–4
|Farès Ziam
|Decision (unanimous)
|UFC Fight Night: Ortega vs. The Korean Zombie 
|
|align=center|3
|align=center|5:00
|Abu Dhabi, United Arab Emirates
|
|-
| Loss
| align=center|12–3
| Brad Riddell
| Decision (unanimous)
| UFC 243
| 
| align=center|3
| align=center|5:00
| Melbourne, Australia
|
|-
| Win
| align=center| 12–2
| Edimar Teixeira
| TKO (retirement)
|Superfight MMA 11
|
|align=center|2 
|align=center|5:00
|Punchbowl, Australia
|
|-
| Win
| align=center| 11–2
| Abel Brites
|TKO (punches)
|Superfight MMA 9
|
|align=center|2
|align=center|1:51
|Punchbowl, Australia
|
|-
| Win
| align=center|10–2
|Josh Togo
| TKO (punches)
| Urban Fight Night 15
| 
| align=center| 1
| align=center| 5:00
| Liverpool, Australia
|
|-
| Win
| align=center|9–2
| Jesse Medina
| TKO (punches)
| BRACE 51
| 
| align=center|3
| align=center|N/A
| Sydney, Australia
|
|-
| Loss
| align=center|8–2
| Luke Catubig
|TKO (elbows)
|BRACE 42
|
|align=center|2
|align=center|4:19
|Canberra, Australia
|
|-
| Loss
| align=center|8–1
| Alexander Volkanovski
|KO (punch)
|AFC 15
|
|align=center|1
|align=center|3:23
|Melbourne, Australia
|
|-
| Win
| align=center|8–0
| Greg Criticos
|Submission (rear-naked choke)
| BRACE 37
| 
| align=center|2
| align=center|3:01
| Canberra, Australia
|
|-
| Win
| align=center| 7–0
| David Simmons
| TKO (punches)
| BRACE 36
| 
| align=center| 1
| align=center| 2:47
| Sydney, Australia
| 
|-
| Win
| align=center| 6–0
| Stefan Rosa
| Submission (rear-naked choke)
| BRACE 33
|
|align=Center|1
|align=center|4:13
|Newcastle, Australia
| 
|-
| Win
| align=center| 5–0
| JJ Van Aswegen
| TKO (knee injury)
| BRACE: Tournament Season 1 Final
| 
| align=center| 1
| align=center| 0:59
|Canberra, Australia
|
|-
| Win
| align=center| 4–0
| Byron Cowell
| Submission (rear-naked choke)
|BRACE 28
|
|align=center|1
|align=center|4:47
| Cammeray, Australia
| 
|-
| Win
| align=center| 3–0
|Joshua Pecastaing
|TKO (punches)
|BRACE 26
|
|align=center|3
|align=center|0:49
|Sydney, Australia
|
|-
| Win
| align=center| 2–0
| David Greaves
| Decision (unanimous)
| Roshambo MMA 2
| 
| align=center| 3
| align=center| 5:00
| Brisbane, Australia
|
|-
| Win
| align=center| 1–0
| Luke Hume
| TKO (punches)
| BRACE 23
| 
| align=center| 1
| align=center| 4:59
| Townsville, Australia
|
|-

See also 
 List of current UFC fighters
 List of male mixed martial artists

References

External links 
  
 

1994 births
Living people
People from the Central Coast (New South Wales)
Sportsmen from New South Wales
Australian male mixed martial artists
Lightweight mixed martial artists
Mixed martial artists utilizing Brazilian jiu-jitsu
Australian practitioners of Brazilian jiu-jitsu
People awarded a black belt in Brazilian jiu-jitsu
Australian people of Irish descent
Ultimate Fighting Championship male fighters